Rudopolje Bruvanjsko is a village in Croatia.

Population

According to the 2011 census, Rudopolje Bruvanjsko had 31 inhabitants.

Napomena: Till 1910 name of the settlement was Rudopolje. In 1857 part of data is in the settlement of Bruvno. It include data for the former settlement of Klapavica Bruvanjska.

1991 census

According to the 1991 census, settlement of Rudopolje Bruvanjsko had 212 inhabitants, which were ethnically declared as this:

Austro-hungarian 1910 census

According to the 1910 census, settlement of Rudopolje Bruvanjsko had 1,340 inhabitants in 5 hamlets, which were linguistically and religiously declared as this:

Literature 

  Savezni zavod za statistiku i evidenciju FNRJ i SFRJ, popis stanovništva 1948, 1953, 1961, 1971, 1981. i 1991. godine.
 Knjiga: "Narodnosni i vjerski sastav stanovništva Hrvatske, 1880–1991: po naseljima, author: Jakov Gelo, izdavač: Državni zavod za statistiku Republike Hrvatske, 1998., ;

References

External links

Populated places in Zadar County
Lika